The Revolutionary Internationalist Movement (RIM) was an international communist organization founded in France in March 1984 by 17 various Maoist organisations around the world. It sought to "struggle for the formation of a Communist International of a new type, based on Marxism–Leninism–Maoism". The RIM appears to be defunct as are many of the founding organisations and many changed their names over the years, or have dropped active armed struggle.

Marxism–Leninism–Maoism 
From 1993 onwards the RIM believed that the experience gained from the People's War in Peru enabled the International Communist Movement "to further deepen [their] grasp of the proletarian ideology and on that basis take a far-reaching step, the recognition of Marxism–Leninism–Maoism as the new, third and higher stage of Marxism". This formulation caused a split in the Maoist movement, with the continued adherents of Mao Zedong Thought leaving RIM and congregating around the International Conference of Marxist–Leninist Parties and Organizations.

Member organisations 
Founding parties at a conference on 12 March 1984 were:
 Union of Iranian Communists (Sarbedaran)
 Ceylon Communist Party (Peking Wing) (Sri Lanka)
 Communist Collective of Agit/Prop (Italy)
 Proletarian Communist Organisation, Marxist–Leninist (Italy)
 Purba Banglar Sarbahara Party
 Communist Party of Colombia (Marxist–Leninist), Mao Tsetung Regional Committee
 Communist Party of Peru
 Communist Party of Turkey/Marxist–Leninist
 Haitian Revolutionary Internationalist Group
 Communist Party of Nepal (Masal)
 New Zealand Red Flag Group
 Revolutionary Communist Group of Colombia
 Central Reorganisation Committee, Communist Party of India (Marxist–Leninist)
 Leading Committee, Revolutionary Communist Party, India
 Revolutionary Communist Party, USA
 Revolutionary Communist Union (Dominican Republic)
 Nottingham Communist Group (Britain)
 Stockport Communist Group (Britain)
The Communist (Maoist) Party of Afghanistan later joined.

The Communist Party of Nepal (Masal) left over differences of political line, but a much larger group, the Communist Party of Nepal (Maoist Centre), is a member. Indian member organizations amalgamated into the Communist Party of India (Maoist).

Of the RIM's one-time participating member organizations, the Maoist Communist Party (Turkey) and the Shining Path are currently engaged in armed conflict. The RIM also supported the revolutionary wars led by the Communist Party of the Philippines and by the Communist Party of India (Maoist).

A World to Win magazine 
A World to Win was published from 1981 to 2006 as the unofficial magazine of the Committee of RIM (CoRIM). Communist Party of India (Maoist) leader Ajith (Murali Kannampilly) was the editor of the magazine.

References

External links 
 Declaration of the Revolutionary Internationalist Movement
 RIM map and Committee of the RIM (CoRIM) statements

 
Anti-revisionist internationals